Spalax is a genus of rodent in the family Spalacidae, subfamily Spalacinae (blind mole-rats). It is one of two extant genera in the subfamily Spalacinae, alongside Nannospalax.

Species in this genus are found in eastern Europe and western & central Asia. They are completely blind and have a subterranean lifestyle.

Taxonomy 
Prior to 2013, Spalax was widely considered the only member of Spalacinae, with all blind mole-rat species being grouped within it. However, phylogenetic and morphological evidence supported some of the species within it forming a distinct lineage that diverged from the others during the Late Miocene, when a marine barrier formed between Anatolia and the Balkans. These species were reclassified into the genus Nannospalax, making Spalax one of two extant spalacine genera.

Species of genus Spalax 

Mehely's blind mole-rat, S. antiquus
Sandy blind mole-rat, S. arenarius
Giant blind mole-rat, S. giganteus
Bukovina blind mole-rat, S. graecus
Oltenia blind mole-rat, S. istricus (possibly extinct)
Greater blind mole-rat, S. microphthalmus
Kazakhstan blind mole-rat, S. uralensis
Podolsk blind mole-rat, S. zemni

References

Further reading

 Musser, G. G. and M. D. Carleton (2005). "Superfamily Muroidea." pp. 894–1531 in Wilson, D. E. and D. M. Reeder, eds. Mammal Species of the World: a Taxonomic and Geographic Reference. 3rd ed. Baltimore: Johns Hopkins University Press.
 
 Nowak, R. M. (1999). Walker's Mammals of the World, II. London: Johns Hopkins University Press 
 
 Topachevskii, V. A. (1976) Fauna of the USSR. Volume III: Mammals. Issue 3: Mole rats, Spalacidae. New Delhi: Amerind.

 
Rodent genera
Extant Miocene first appearances
ar:خلد
fr:Spalacinae
pl:Ślepce
Taxa named by Johann Anton Güldenstädt